Luca Bottazzi (born 1 April 1963) is a former professional tennis player from Italy.

Career
Bottazzi was twice a quarter-finalist in the French Open boys' singles during his junior career, in both 1980 and 1981. He reached the round of 16 in the US Open boys' singles in 1980 and in the Wimbledon boys' singles in 1981.

When he returned to the French Open in 1982, it was in the men's draw, beside Raúl Viver in the doubles competition. They defeated the Swedish combination of Anders Järryd and Hans Simonsson in the first round but were then beaten by Brad Guan and Derek Tarr.

In 1984, he made the quarter-finals of the Palermo Grand Prix tournament, with wins over the world's 50th ranked player Blaine Willenborg and Argentina's Alejandro Ganzábal.

The Italian was beaten by Marko Ostoja in the opening round of the 1985 French Open.

After his tennis career, Bottazzi co-founded the Italian Tennis Research Association (RITA). He developed new scientific methods to teach tennis to young pupils, that were presented at the ITF Tennis Science and Technology Congress in 2003.

Bottazzi currently works as a tennis coach and television commentator for Eurosport and Sky Italia.

Challenger titles

Singles: (2)

Doubles: (1)

References

1963 births
Living people
Tennis players from Milan
Italian male tennis players
Mediterranean Games medalists in tennis
Mediterranean Games bronze medalists for Italy
Competitors at the 1983 Mediterranean Games
20th-century Italian people
21st-century Italian people